Diego Álvarez and Carles Poch-Gradin defeated Carlos Avellán and Eric Gomes 7–6(7), 6–1 in the final. They became the first champions of this tournament.

Seeds

Draw

Draw

References
 Doubles Draw

Seguros Bolivar Open Bucaramanga - Doubles
2009 Doubles